Valkyria Chronicles is an anime series loosely based on the Sega video game Valkyria Chronicles. It began broadcasting on April 4, 2009. The show is produced by Aniplex's A-1 Pictures. The series is directed by Yasutaka Yamamoto and written by Michiko Yokote under the Project Valkyria Group. Valkyria Chronicles aired on Animax, Tokyo MX, MBS, CBC, Chiba TV, Television Kanagawa, Television Hokkaido, BS11 and TVQ Kyushu Broadcasting.

Set during the Second Europan War between The Autocratic East Europan Imperial Alliance and Atlantic Federation, the plot focuses on the Gallian Front fought between the Empire and The Principality of Gallia. Welkin Gunther, a college student and son of the First Europan War hero General Belgen Gunther, Isara Gunther, a brilliant Darcsen mechanic and Welkin's foster sister, and Alicia Melchiott, a baker and member of the Bruhl Townwatch, get involved in the war when the Imperials invade Gallia to secure its rich Ragnite deposits. After managing to escape their hometown Bruhl after the Imperials captured it, the three of them join Squad 7 of the Gallian Militia to help free their country from the Empire.

The theme song,  is performed by Catherine St. Onge, as winner of the Animax Anison Grand Prix competition, under her chosen moniker of Himeka; the original score for the anime is composed and conducted by the game's composer Hitoshi Sakimoto. Her CD single has been released on May 27, 2009. The ending theme,  is sung by the band pe'zmoku with a CD single released on May 27, 2009; the special version features a cover of Welkin, Alicia and Faldio. The second theme song, is sung by Maria that starts episode 14. The second ending song, is sung by Hikari Inoue beginning from episode 14 until episode 25. Episode 26's ending song is "Brightest Morning", which is also performed by Inoue. CD singles for Kanashimi Rensa and Hitotsu no Negai were released on August 12, 2009 and August 5, 2009. A Valkyria Chronicles drama CD was released on July 24, 2009 with another on October 7, 2009.

Nine Region 2 DVDs of Valkyria Chronicles were released, with volume 1 released on August 5, 2009. Volume 2 was released on September 2, 2009. Volume 3 was released on October 7, 2009. Volume 4 was released on November 4, 2009. Volume 5 was released on December 12, 2009. Volume 6 was released January 13, 2010. Volume 7 was released on February 3, 2010. Volume 8 was released on March 3, 2010. Volume 9 was released on April 7, 2010.

Valkyria Chronicles Episode List

Valkyria Chronicles Theater - OVA Episode List

References

External links
 Official Valkyria Chronicles TV episode guide 

Valkyria Chronicles
Episodes